The Commander of Kosovo Security Force is the highest-ranking military officer of in the Kosovo Security Force, who is responsible for maintaining the operational command of the military.

List of chiefs

References

Military of Kosovo
Kosovo